The Hangzhou Metro is a rapid transit system that serves Hangzhou in Zhejiang province, China. The system opened on November 24, 2012. It is the 17th city in China to operate a rapid transit system.

Network

Metro

Commuter rail

Description
There are currently 13 lines (12 metro lines and 1 commuter rail) in operation. The adjacent Shaoxing Metro connects the system at Guniangqiao station of Line 5.

 Line 1 is an arc-shaped line, begins at Xianghu in Xiaoshan, stretches across downtown Hangzhou after crossing the Qiantang River and ends at Hangzhou Xiaoshan Int'l Airport. It connects West Lake, Hangzhou Railway Station, Hangzhou East Railway Station, Xiasha Higher Education Park and the Airport. It used to have a branch line to Linping District, which became part of Line 9 in July 2021.
 Line 2 links the Xiaoshan Industrial Park with Qianjiang Century City, Downtown Hangzhou and Liangzhu in Yuhang District. It runs in northwest–southeast direction.
 Line 3 begins in Xingqiao subdistrict in Linping District, runs in northeast–southwest direction and terminates at Wushanqiancun, North of Hangzhou West Railway Station. A branch commence near Xixi Wetland and connects Xiaoheshan Higher Education Park.
 Line 4 is a "?" shaped line that stretching from Puyan to Chihua Street in north Sandunzhen in Xihu District. It connects Puyan, West Lake scenic area south, Qianjiang New City, Hangzhou East Railway Station and several residential areas in the north part of the city.
 Line 5 is a "Z" shaped line stretching from Future Sci-Tech City in Yuhang District, passing multiple areas in the downtown and ends near Hangzhou-Shaoxing city limit. It provides multiple points of transfer and it is one of the busiest line in the system, serving more than 500,000 passengers per day.
 Line 6 connects Fuyang District with Olympic Sports Park, Qianjiang Century City, Asian Games Village and the Hangzhou East Railway Station. It is one of two metro lines linking the main venue of 2022 Asian Games.
 Line 7 links the West Lake with Qianjiang New City, Olympic Sports Park, Hangzhou Xiaoshan Int'l Airport and Dajiangdong Industrial Park.
 Line 8 provides a link between Xiasha Higher Education Park and Dajiangdong Industrial Park.
 Line 9 provides a link between Qianjiang New City and Linping District. The section between Linping and Coach Center was part of Line 1 until 10 July 2021.
 Line 10 provides a North–South link between Huanglong Sports Center and Renhe subdistrict in Yuhang. It plans to connect Hangzhou-Deqing Intercity Rail in the future.
 Line 16 is an express metro line linking Lin'an District with Yuhang District.
 Line 19 is an express metro line linking Hangzhou West Railway Station, Hangzhou East Railway Station and Hangzhou Xiaoshan International Airport.
 Hanghai line is a commuter rail line which links Linping District in Hangzhou with Haining in Jiaxing, passing multiple towns as well as the famous China Leather City.

The Hangzhou Metro has the only metro system map in China whose first seven lines follow the hue order of the rainbow colors.

History

Initial plans
The planning for a metro system in the city started in the 1990s and was about to start construction works in September 2003, but the State Council suspended construction works due to increasing costs. The state council approved the construction and operation of a rapid transit system by the Hangzhou Subway Group Co. Ltd in Hangzhou on June 5, 2005. The preliminary design for the first line, Line 1, was approved on January 11, 2007, by the Development and Reform Commission after four days of study.

Construction

Construction of the first phase of Hangzhou Metro Line 1 began on March 28, 2007, with subsequent phases beginning later in that year. The first phase included three underground stations in Qianjiang New City. Jiubao East Station is the biggest station along Line 1 and will be a hub for the future metro system and other forms of public transport. The funding of Line 1 came from both the city government and the banks, with 10.2 billion yuan and 5 billion yuan respectively. The first phase construction was estimated to be 45 billion yuan.

In January 2009, it was announced that MTR Corporation would invest in a 22 billion-yuan ($3.2 billion) / 25-year / 49% share joint venture with the Hangzhou government to operate Line 1 of the metro.

The first section of Line 4 opened for trial operation on February 2, 2015.

In December 2016, the National Development and Reform Commission approved the planning for 10 lines, including extensions to the three existing lines, scheduled to open in time for the 2022 Asian Games.

Accident
On November 15, 2008, a  section of the tunnel near Fengqing Avenue in Xiaoshan District collapsed while under construction, killing 17 people.

Future expansions

Under Construction

Phase IV Expansion 
On November 14, 2022 the NDRC approved the 4th Phase Expansion plan consisting of 152.9km of new lines.

Notes

References

External links

 Hangzhou Metro (official site) 
 Urbanrail page on the Hangzhou Metro

 
Rapid transit in China
Metro
Rail transport in Zhejiang
Railway lines opened in 2012
2012 establishments in China
Projects established in 1984